The Creases are an Australian indie rock band formed in Brisbane in April 2013. They have released one studio album to date.

History
The Creases formed in Brisbane in April 2013 initially a duo, with Joe Agius on lead vocals and guitar and Jarod Mahon on bass guitar and vocals; they were joined in October by Aimon Clark on lead guitar and Bridie McQueen on drums. In 2014 McQueen was replaced on drums by Gabriel Webster. They performed at Australian festivals and supported gigs by Franz Ferdinand. 

The band issued their debut extended play, Gradient, in July 2014. It was recorded in the previous December with Simon Berckelman producing. Beat Magazines Simon Welby felt, "[its] sunny and relatively slick production quality is a marked sonic advance from the tracks that initially brought them attention... Stylistically, the EP steps beyond the jangly garage pop of 'I Won't Wait' to align itself with acts of the shoegaze and dream pop ilk (Yo La Tengo, The Jesus and Mary Chain, Ride)."

In July 2017, The Creases released their debut studio album, Tremolow,  which reached  the ARIA Top 100 Physical Albums and No. 21 on the ARIA Hitseekers Albums charts. Jack Gobbe of Outlet Mag observed, "With charming song writing and catchy hooks that are often emphasised by stirring backing vocals, you'll soon find a significant chunk of the record ringing in your head for days to come."

Members
 Joe Agius – guitar, vocals 
 Jarod Mahon – bass guitar, vocals 
 Aimon Clark – guitar, vocals 
 Bridie McQueen – drums 
 Gabriel Webster – drums

Discography

Studio albums

Extended plays

Singles

Awards and nominations

Queensland Music Awards
The Queensland Music Awards (previously known as Q Song Awards) are annual awards celebrating Queensland, Australia's brightest emerging artists and established legends. They commenced in 2006.
 
|-
| 2016
| Joe Agius (The Creases)
| The BOQ People's Choice Award Most Promising Male Songwriter
|

References 

Australian indie rock groups
Musical quintets
Musical groups from Brisbane
Musical groups established in 2013
2013 establishments in Australia